Jacques Soulie, a native of Toulouse, France, is the Director of the Alliance Francaise (French Cultural Centre) in Kandy, Central Sri Lanka. A psychiatrist by profession, Dr Soulie has been based in Sri Lanka for many years. He goes down in the history of Franco Sri Lanka Relations as an exemplary Frenchman who rendered enormous services to teaching French in Sri Lanka. He has been teaching French at the Alliance Francaise in Kandy for many years. Dr Soulie conducted the Diploma Course in French-Diplome de Langue Francaise and the Higher Diploma in French-Diplome Superieur de langue francaise.

Apart from his work at the Alliance Francaise, Dr Soulie has been working at the University of Peradeniya, near Kandy, as a visiting lecturer in French.

Soulie speaks and understands the Sinhalese language. He has been instrumental in organising many arts and literary events at the Alliance Francaise de Kandy, making it a major cultural venue in the Hill Capital.

References

Year of birth missing (living people)
Physicians from Toulouse
Living people
Sri Lankan people of French descent